Makpoloka Mangonga (born 3 September 1968) is a Democratic Republic of the Congo retired footballer.

Career

Starting his senior career at AS Béziers Hérault in the French third division, Mangonga was wanted by Ligue 1 clubs Girondins de Bordeaux and Montpellier HSC but ended up playing for Paços de Ferreira in the Portuguese second division due to transfer difficulties.

After playing for Paços de Ferreira, he trained with Porto, the second most successful Portuguese team, before signing with Gil Vicente in the second division. In 1995, Mangonga was released from Gil Vicente. The way he was dismissed by the club, coupled with family problems, soured his relationship with football and he never visited a stadium since retirement.

References

External links
 Mangonga at National Football Teams

Democratic Republic of the Congo footballers
Living people
Association football forwards
1968 births
Association football wingers
Democratic Republic of the Congo international footballers
F.C. Paços de Ferreira players
Gil Vicente F.C. players
Académico de Viseu F.C. players
F.C. Tirsense players
S.C. Beira-Mar players
Expatriate footballers in Portugal
C.F. Fão players
21st-century Democratic Republic of the Congo people